Hyposmocoma filicivora is a species of moth of the family Cosmopterigidae. It was first described by Edward Meyrick in 1935. It is endemic to the Hawaiian island of Oahu. The type locality is Kōnāhuanui.

The larva constructs a flat case. It lives in the hollows of dead tree fern fronds.

External links

filicivora
Endemic moths of Hawaii
Moths described in 1935